Chhnam Oun 16 is a 1973 Cambodian film starring Chea Yuthon and Saom Vansodany. Shortly after the film was released, the public found Chea Yuthon and saom Vansodany engaged.

Cast 
 Chea Yuthon
 Saom Vansodany

Soundtrack

References 
 

1973 films
Khmer-language films
Cambodian drama films